Elizabeth Roxanne Haysom (born April 15, 1964 in Salisbury, Rhodesia) is a Canadian citizen who, along with her boyfriend, Jens Söring, was convicted of orchestrating the 1985 double murder of her parents Derek and Nancy Haysom in Bedford County, Virginia. Following the Haysoms' murders, she and Söring were arrested in London for check fraud and shoplifting. 

Haysom served 32 years of a 90-year prison sentence at the Fluvanna Correctional Center for Women in Troy, Virginia after pleading guilty to two counts of accessory to murder before the fact in 1987. She and Söring were paroled on November 25, 2019, more than 30 years after they were first convicted of the deaths of Haysom’s parents in 1985.

Haysom was diagnosed as having a borderline personality disorder by several court psychiatrists.

Early life
Elizabeth Haysom is the child of Derek William Reginald Haysom, a steel executive, and Nancy Astor Benedict Haysom, an artist. Derek and Nancy had a combined total of five children from previous marriages. Born in April 1964, Elizabeth attended boarding schools in Switzerland and England (Wycombe Abbey), then enrolled at the University of Virginia. It was there she met her 18-year-old boyfriend Jens Söring.

Murders
On the morning of April 3, 1985, when Söring was 18 and Haysom was 20, the bodies of Derek and Nancy Haysom were discovered. They had been slashed and stabbed to death in their home in the Boonsboro neighborhood of Lynchburg, Virginia. Both Derek and Nancy were almost decapitated. The couple's bodies were not discovered until days after the murder. During the timeline of the murder, Haysom had rented a car. She and Jens drove to Washington, D.C. to establish an alibi.

Flight to England
Haysom and Söring were not initially suspects in the Haysoms' murders. Six months after the murder, Söring and Haysom went to England, where they were arrested on April 30, 1986 for shoplifting and check fraud, having written fake checks totalling .

Convictions
In 1987, Haysom, then 23 years old, pleaded guilty to two counts of accessory to murder before the fact, and was sentenced to 90 years in prison – one 45-year sentence for each murder, to be served consecutively. Söring pleaded not guilty, but was found guilty at his 1990 trial and sentenced  to two consecutive life terms for first-degree murder.

Haysom was incarcerated in the Fluvanna Correctional Center for Women in Troy, Virginia. first became eligible for parole in 1995, and submitted a parole request every three years thereafter. Haysom's sentence was subject to mandatory parole; she would have been released automatically in 2032, 45 years after her conviction.

Parole 

On 25 November 2019, Virginia Governor Ralph Northam announced that both Haysom and Söring would be released on parole, but not pardoned, and sent back to their respective home countries. After more than 30 years in prison, Haysom was released from prison to the custody of U.S. Immigration and Customs Enforcement, and then deported to her home country of Canada in February 2020.

U.S. Representative Ben Cline issued a statement condemning her release as a cost-cutting attempt by the state of Virginia, and not based on merit. Adrianne L. Bennett, then chair of the Virginia Parole Board, asserted that the decision to grant Haysom parole was also justified by her young age at the time the crime was committed.

Jens Söring, Haysom's accomplice, was also granted parole in November 2019 and was deported to his home country of Germany after his release.

In the media

The Söring/Haysom criminal proceedings were the first to be broadcast nationwide on American television. The Haysoms' murders have been profiled by 20/20, The Investigators, Geraldo Rivera, The New Detectives, City Confidential, Wicked Attraction, Deadly Women, On the Case with Paula Zahn, Snapped: Killer Couples, and Southern Fried Homicide.

Killing for Love, a feature documentary film, premiered at the Munich International Film Festival and was released theatrically in October 2016.

References

External links

 official movie website Killing for Love documentary
 official website of the production company of The Promise

1964 births
20th-century Canadian criminals
Canadian female murderers
Canadian people imprisoned abroad
Living people
Parricides
People educated at Wycombe Abbey
People extradited from the United Kingdom to the United States
People with borderline personality disorder
Place of birth missing (living people)
University of Virginia alumni
20th-century Canadian women